Vietnamobile is a Vietnamese mobile network operator. It is a joint-venture of Hanoi Telecom and Hutchison Asia Telecom Group and the fourth largest provider as of 2012.

History
HT Mobile was set up in 2007 as a joint-venture of Hanoi Telecom and Hutchison Asia Telecom Group. It was renamed to Vietnamobile in 2009, accompanied by the adoption of GSM technology to replace the less popular CDMA.

It started offering 3G services in late 2011, long after its major competitors.

Market share and competitors
Vietnamobile had a market share (estimated based on revenues) of 8% in 2012. 
Its main competitors are Viettel with a market share of 40.67%, Vinaphone with 30%, MobiFone with 17.9%, the three large state-owned providers with a market share of almost 90%. The only smaller competitors are Gmobile and S-Fone.

References

CK Hutchison Holdings
Mobile phone companies of Vietnam
Joint ventures